Marko Kavčič (born 8 July 1949) is a Slovenian alpine skier. He competed in two events at the 1972 Winter Olympics, representing Yugoslavia.

References

External links
 

1949 births
Living people
Slovenian male alpine skiers
Olympic alpine skiers of Yugoslavia
Alpine skiers at the 1972 Winter Olympics
Skiers from Ljubljana